Daniel Raymond Massey (10 October 193325 March 1998) was an English actor and performer. He is possibly best known for his starring role in the British TV drama The Roads to Freedom, as Daniel, alongside Michael Bryant. He is also known for his role in the 1968 American film Star!, as Noël Coward (Massey's godfather), for which he won a Golden Globe Award and an Oscar nomination.

Early life
Massey was born in London in 1933. He was educated at Eton College and King's College, Cambridge. He was a member of the noted Massey family, which included his father, Raymond Massey, his sister, Anna Massey and his uncle Vincent Massey, the first Canadian-born Governor General of Canada. His mother was the actress Adrianne Allen.

Living with his mother after his parents' divorce, Massey rarely saw his father through most of his adult life; however, they were cast as father and son in The Queen's Guards (1961).

Career
Massey made his film debut as a child in his godfather Noël Coward's naval drama, In Which We Serve (1942). He would later play Coward in the 1968 Julie Andrews vehicle Star!, a performance for which he won a Golden Globe Award and received his sole Academy Award nomination for Best Supporting Actor.

He made a major impression as an adult as Laurence Olivier's son-in-law in the stage and screen versions of John Osborne's The Entertainer (film in 1960). Massey appeared in numerous British films from the 1950s onwards, including Cromwell, The Cat and the Canary (1979), The Jokers (1967), The Vault of Horror (1973), Mary, Queen of Scots (1971), Victory! (1981) and In the Name of the Father (1993).

Other highlights of his career were his stage roles, especially that of the German conductor Wilhelm Furtwängler in Ronald Harwood's Taking Sides; Massey was nominated for the 1996 Olivier Award as Best Actor. He recreated the role for Broadway in 1996, earning a 1997 Drama Desk Award nomination for Outstanding Actor In A Play. His other Broadway stage appearances included musicals such as She Loves Me as Georg in 1963 and Gigi (as Gaston) in 1973.

He appeared in Stephen Sondheim's Follies as Benjamin Stone in the West End in 1987. In the 1980s and 1990s, he also appeared with the Royal Shakespeare Company in productions such as Love's Labour's Lost, Measure for Measure and The Time of Your Life, the latter alongside John Thaw.

In 1970 Massey played the role of the openly gay character Daniel, alongside a cast headed by Michael Bryant as Mathieu in the acclaimed multi-part BBC adaptation of Jean Paul Sartre's The Roads to Freedom.

Other television highlights of Massey's career include The Crucible on the BBC (1981) as Reverend Hale, The Golden Bowl (1972) as the Prince, in the Inspector Morse episode "Deceived by Flight" as Anthony Donn, again with John Thaw, and his performance as an AIDS patient in Intimate Contact (1987). With Jeremy Brett as Sherlock Holmes, he played a US Senator in "The Problem of Thor Bridge", series 3, episode 2, The Case-Book of Sherlock Holmes, Granada Television, 1991. Brett had once been married to Massey's sister, Anna, and was father to Massey's nephew by Anna, actor David Huggins. He also stole mostly every scene he appeared in the Alan Bleasdale classic G.B.H. (1991) as the awkward eccentric hotel owner, Grosvenor.

Personal life
Massey was married three times, two of his wives being well-known actresses: 
Adrienne Corri (1961–1967)
Penelope Wilton (1975–1984); one daughter, Alice Massey and a stillborn son. 
 Linda Wilton (1986–1998) (a sister of Penelope)

Death
He died in London, on 25 March 1998 from Hodgkin's lymphoma, which had been diagnosed in 1992. 
 His body was interred at Putney Vale Cemetery. Massey worked in theatre throughout his cancer treatments, rarely missing a performance.

Selected filmography

 In Which We Serve (1942) – Bobby Kinross
 Girls at Sea (1958) – Flag. Lt. Courtney
 Operation Bullshine (1959) – Bombardier Peter Palmer
 Upstairs and Downstairs (1959) – Wesley Cotes
 The Entertainer (1960) – Graham
 The Queen's Guards (1961) – John Fellowes
 Go to Blazes (1962) – Harry
 The Amorous Adventures of Moll Flanders (1965) – Elder Brother
 The Jokers (1967) – Riggs
 Star! (1968) – Noël Coward
 Fragment of Fear (1970) – Maj. Ricketts
 Mary, Queen of Scots (1971) – Robert Dudley
 The Vault of Horror (1973) – Rogers (segment 1 "Midnight Mess")
 The Incredible Sarah (1976) – Victorien Sardou
 The Devil's Advocate (1977) – Black
 Warlords of Atlantis (1978) – Atraxon
 The Cat and the Canary (1978) – Dr. Harry Blythe
 Love with a Perfect Stranger (1986) - Hugo DeLassey
 Bad Timing (1980) – Foppish Man
 Escape to Victory (1981) – Colonel Waldron 
 Scandal (1989) – Mervyn Griffith-Jones
 In the Name of the Father (1993) – Prosecutor
 The Miracle Maker (2000) – Cleopas (voice) (final film role)

References

Granada Television:  screen credits.

External links

1933 births
1998 deaths
Daniel Raymond Massey
Alumni of King's College, Cambridge
English male musical theatre actors
English male film actors
English male television actors
English male voice actors
English people of Canadian descent
People educated at Eton College
Male actors from London
Royal Shakespeare Company members
Deaths from Hodgkin lymphoma
Burials at Putney Vale Cemetery
Deaths from cancer in England
20th-century English male actors
20th-century English singers
Best Supporting Actor Golden Globe (film) winners
Laurence Olivier Award winners
People from Westminster
20th-century British male singers